A tiger tail is the tail of a tiger.

Tiger tail may also refer to:
 Tiger Tail (19th century), Seminole leader
 Tiger Tail (play), a 1970 stage play by Tennessee Williams based on his screenplay for Baby Doll
 Tiger tail banding of hair, a symptom of trichothiodystrophy
 Tiger tail donut, a donut that is twisted with another ingredient so that it looks like the tail of a tiger
 Tiger tail ice cream, orange-flavoured ice cream with black licorice chunks
 Tiger Tail Peninsula, a nonexistent land form in southeast Asia found in medieval world maps
 Tiger tail seahorse (Hippocampus comes), a species of fish
 Tiger Tail, Tennessee, an unincorporated community
 Tiger tail wire, a kind of thin wire encased in nylon
 Tiger Tail, the title of the reissue of jazz saxophonist Stanley Turrentine's album Stan "The Man" Turrentine

See also
 Tiger by the Tail (disambiguation)
 Tigertail (disambiguation)
 Tiger Tale, a 2002 children's picture book
 Tail of a Tiger, a 1984 Australian film
 The Tiger's Tail, a 2006 Irish film